The 1959 Calgary Stampeders finished in 4th place in the W.I.F.U. with an 8–8 record and failed to make the playoffs.

This was the Stamps last season at Mewata Stadium. They would move into their new home McMahon Stadium a year later.

Regular season

Season standings

Season schedule

Awards and records
 None

References

Calgary Stampeders seasons
1959 Canadian Football League season by team